Jason King (born September 14, 1981) is a Canadian professional ice hockey executive and former player. King is currently assistant coach of the Vancouver Canucks of the National Hockey League (NHL).

Playing career
King was drafted by the Vancouver Canucks of the National Hockey League in the seventh round (212th overall) of the 2001 Entry Draft, after having played 3 seasons for the Halifax Mooseheads of the QMJHL. He found some success playing with twin brothers Henrik and Daniel Sedin in his first full season with the team, registering 12 goals in 2003–04, the bulk of which came in the team's first few games. This led him to being awarded the NHL Rookie of the Month award for the month of November. The line quickly earned the nickname "The Mattress Line," due to its members figuratively composing "two twins and a king." He spent the 2004–05 season playing for Vancouver's then-AHL affiliates, the Manitoba Moose, where he suffered a serious concussion - one that took him many months to recover from.

After refusing to sign the Canucks' qualifying offer for the 2006–07 season, King opted to play for Skellefteå AIK in the Swedish elite league Elitserien. His rights were traded to the Anaheim Ducks on June 23, 2007, in exchange for Ryan Shannon. In the 2007–08 season, King made his return to the NHL playing in four games with the Ducks although he primarily played for their affiliate, the Portland Pirates, of the AHL.

King went back to Europe in 2008 and played three seasons in the German elite league, one with Adler Mannheim and two with the Hamburg Freezers.  After returning from Germany, King played two seasons with the St. John's IceCaps, the minor league affiliate of the Winnipeg Jets.

Coaching career
King announced his retirement as a player in August 2013 and was subsequently hired by the IceCaps as an assistant coach. After two years in the job, he was named Director of Hockey Operations. He returned to an assistant coach role after one season upon the Canucks moving their AHL affiliate, to the Utica Comets. On December 23, 2020, King was promoted to work as an assistant coach on the Canucks' coaching staff for the 2020–21 NHL season.

Career statistics

Awards and honours

References

External links
 

1981 births
Adler Mannheim players
Anaheim Ducks players
Canadian expatriate ice hockey players in Germany
Canadian expatriate ice hockey players in Sweden
Canadian ice hockey centres
Canadian ice hockey coaches
Halifax Mooseheads players
Hamburg Freezers players
Ice hockey people from Newfoundland and Labrador
Living people
Manitoba Moose players
People from Corner Brook
Portland Pirates players
Skellefteå AIK players
St. John's IceCaps coaches
St. John's IceCaps players
Vancouver Canucks draft picks
Vancouver Canucks players